was a Japanese clan that claimed descent from Minamoto no Yorimitsu (948-1021) of the Seiwa Genji. Minamoto no Yasumasa, the fourth generation descending from Yorimitsu, and younger brother of Minamoto no Yorimasa (1104-1180), was the first to call himself 'Ikeda'.

In the Edo period, several of the clan's branches were daimyō families, most notably of the Tottori Domain and Okayama Domain. Takamasa Ikeda, former head of the Okayama Ikeda house was the husband of Atsuko Ikeda, fourth daughter of Emperor Shōwa. Inryoji Temple was built during the reign of Ikeda Tadakatsu.

Settsu-Ikeda family

 Ikeda Korezane
 Ikeda Koremochi
 Ikeda Koresada
 Ikeda Kimisada
 Ikeda Yasusada
 Ikeda Yasumasa
 Ikeda Yasumitsu
 Ikeda Yasunaga
 Ikeda Yasutsugu
 Ikeda Yasutada
 Ikeda Kagemasa
 Ikeda Noriyori
 Ikeda Norimasa
 Ikeda Kazumasa
 Ikeda Iemasa
 Ikeda Mitsumasa
 Ikeda Sadamasa
 Ikeda Nobumasa (d.1548)
 Ikeda Nagamasa (d.1563)
 Ikeda Katsumasa (1530/1539-1578)
 Ikeda Tomomasa (1555-1604)
 Ikeda Sankuro (1589-1605)
 Ikeda Mitsushige (d.1628)
 Ikeda Mitsunaga
 Ikeda Sadanaga
 Ikeda Sadashige
 Ikeda Akisada
 Ikeda Sadahiko
 Ikeda Sadao
 Ikeda Sadakazu
 Ikeda Sadamizu
 Ikeda Tonemune

Mino-Ikeda family

 Ikeda Tsunetoshi (d.1538)
 Ikeda Tsuneoki
 Ikeda Terumasa
 Ikeda Toshitaka (1584-1616)
 Ikeda Tadakatsu
 Ikeda Mitsumasa
 Ikeda Tsunamasa
 Ikeda Tsugumasa
 Ikeda Munemasa
 Ikeda Harumasa (1750-1819)
 Ikeda Narimasa (1773-1833)
 Ikeda Naritoshi (1811-1842)
 Ikeda Yoshimasa (1823-1893)
 Ikeda Mochimasa (1839-1899)
 Ikeda Akimasa (1836-1903)
 Ikeda Norimasa (1866-1909)
 Ikeda Tadamasa (1895-1920)
 Ikeda Nobumasa (1904-1988)
 Ikeda Takamasa (1926-2012)

Known members of the Ikeda clan

 Yōtoku-in (養徳院), was the wet nurse (foster mother) of Oda Nobunaga.
Ikeda Sen (Senhime)
Ikeda Tsuneoki (1536 – May 18, 1584)
 Ikeda Terumasa (January 31, 1565 – March 16, 1613)
 Ikeda Mitsumasa (May 10, 1609 – June 27, 1682)
 Ikeda Tsunamasa (February 18, 1638 – December 5, 1714)
 Ikeda Munemasa (1727–1764) 
 Atsuko Ikeda (b. 7 March 1931)

References

  "Ikeda-shi" on Harimaya.com (29 Feb. 2008)

 
Japanese clans